USS Edenton has been the name of four ships in the United States Navy.  

 , was a cargo ship that served from 1918 until 1919.
 , a submarine chaser, collided with  January/February 1945.
 , a submarine chaser.
  was initially used by the Navy until 1997 when she was transferred to the Coast Guard and renamed .

United States Navy ship names